Professor Susan Rossell is a British researcher based at Swinburne University of Technology specialising in Neuropsychology and Neuroimaging. Originally from Nottingham, UK; she now resides in Melbourne, Australia. Her research on the neuropsychology of schizophrenia and body dysmorphic disorder is internationally recognised.

Early life and education 
Susan spent her childhood in Nottingham. She is the daughter of Anthony and Penny Rossell. She has two younger brothers, John and Paul. Susan attended The Gedling School and Forest Fields School in Nottingham, UK. She gained a Bachelor of Psychology and Neuroscience (Hons) from the University of Manchester and a Doctor of Philosophy in Cognitive Neuropsychiatry from the Institute of Psychiatry King's College London; both UK.

Career
After her doctorate Susan spent two years as a postdoctoral researcher within Experimental Psychology at the University of Oxford (1998-2000) and collaborated with the Functional Imaging Laboratory in Queens Square. During this time she completed one of the first known studies to look at brain function using functional magnetic resonance imaging (fMRI) and event related potentials (ERPs).  Subsequently, she was awarded a prestigious Wellcome Trust International Travel Fellowship (2000-2004) and was based at Macquarie University in Sydney, Australia within their Macquarie Centre for Cognitive Sciences (MACCS), as well as at the Institute of Psychiatry in London. The focus of her fellowship was to improve our understanding of thought disorder in schizophrenia and bipolar disorder using clinical interviews, psycholinguistics, cognitive assessments and brain imaging.

Susan became the Head of the Cognitive Neuropsychiatry at the Mental Health Research Institute of Victoria, Melbourne from 2004 to 2007. She moved to the Monash Alfred Psychiatry Research Centre in 2008 and was an adjunct member until 2018

In 2010, she was appointed to a tenured chair in Neuropsychology at Swinburne University of Technology. Professor Susan Rossell was the inaugural Director of Neuroimaging from 2011 to 2017, she was subsequently the inaugural Director of the Centre for Mental Health (CMH) in 2018. In January 2019 she stepped down from her CMH Directorship as she was awarded an NHMRC Senior Research Fellowship.

Professor Rossell has served as a Section Editor of the European Journal of Neuroscience (EJN) since 2015.

Research
Over the last 20 years, Susan has published more than 250 peer-reviewed scientific papers and book chapters. She has established an internationally recognised group in the fields of schizophrenia and body dysmorphic disorder research, particularly the neuropsychology and neuroimaging of the disorders.

She is highly experienced in the application of both structural and functional brain imaging to psychiatric disorders and has been awarded a number of NHMRC grants, as well as funding from The Wellcome Trust. Her work has been internationally recognised with invited talks to the UK and Europe.

Personal 
Susan has a daughter, Madalyn.

Awards 
 1999: International Congress of Schizophrenia Research Young Investigator Award
 2002: Winter workshop on Schizophrenia Research Young Investigator Award 
 2004: Winter workshop on Schizophrenia Research Special Investigator Award

References

External links 
 
 Staff profile at Swinburne University
 PubMed entry

Australian women scientists
Living people
Alumni of King's College London
Australian Women of Neuroscience 2014
Year of birth missing (living people)
Academic staff of Swinburne University of Technology
Neuropsychologists
People from Nottingham